Andrey Pilipovets (born 17 February 1999) is a Belarusian professional footballer.

References

External links 
 
 

1999 births
Living people
Belarusian footballers
Association football defenders
FC Shakhtyor Soligorsk players
FC Baranovichi players
FC Torpedo Minsk players
FC Rukh Brest players